Tomás José Gomensoro Albín (27 January 1810 – 12 April 1900) was a Uruguayan political figure.

Background

Born in Dolores, Soriano, Uruguay, he was a member of the Colorado Party (Uruguay). He served as President of the Senate of Uruguay from 1871 to 1872.

In March 1872, President of Uruguay Lorenzo Batlle stepped down from office.

President of Uruguay (interim)

From 1872 to 1873 Gomensoro served as President of Uruguay (interim).

While his term office was intended to be temporary in nature, it actually lasted almost one year. In February 1873 he was succeeded as President by José Eugenio Ellauri.

Death and commemoration
He served second time as President of the Senate of Uruguay from 1892 to 1893. Gomensoro died in 1900, having attained the age of 90.

Town in Artigas Department named after Gomensoro

The town of Tomás Gomensoro in the Artigas Department of northern Uruguay is named after him.

References

 
 :es:Tomás Gomensoro (político)

See also

 Tomas Gomensoro#Location and history
 Politics of Uruguay
 Colorado Party (Uruguay)#Earlier History

1810 births
1900 deaths
Presidents of the Senate of Uruguay
People from Dolores, Uruguay
Colorado Party (Uruguay) politicians
Presidents of Uruguay
19th-century Uruguayan people